Hangin Around The Observatory is the debut solo studio album by American singer-songwriter John Hiatt. It was released in 1974 through Epic Records. Recording sessions took place at Columbia Recording Studios in Nashville. Production was handled by Glen Spreen. The song "Sure As I'm Sittin' Here" was covered that same year by Three Dog Night on their album Hard Labor, and was a top 20 hit.

Track listing

Personnel
John Hiatt – songwriter, arranger, design
Glen Spreen – producer, remixing
Gene Eichelberger – recording engineer
Stan Hutto – recording engineer and remixing
Ron Reynolds – recording and technical engineer
Mike Figlio – recording engineer
Ed Hudson – technical engineer
Jerry Watson – technical engineer
Charles Bradley – technical engineer
Freeman Ramsey – technical engineer
Lou Bradley – remixing
Bill Barnes – design
Peggy Owens – design
Wilbur "Slick" Lawson – photography

References

External links

1974 debut albums
John Hiatt albums
Epic Records albums